The Democratic Alliance for Saint Martin (Alliance démocratique pour Saint-Martin) is a political party in Saint Martin, led by Wendel Cocks. It won in the 1 July and 8 July 2007 Territorial Council elections despite 7.76% no seats. 

Political parties in the Collectivity of Saint Martin